Larry Wayne Vanover (born August 22, 1955) is an American professional baseball umpire. Vanover worked in the National League from 1991 to 1999.  He did not umpire in 2000 and 2001, and since 2002 has umpired across both major leagues. Vanover has umpired in three Division Series (2006, 2013, 2016), three League Championship Series (2003, 2007, 2011), and the 2016 World Series.  He also has officiated in two All Star Games (1999, 2013) and the 2009 World Baseball Classic.

Career
Vanover worked in several minor leagues before his major league debut in 1991. He officiated in the South Atlantic League, Midwest League, Southern League, American Association, Pacific Coast League, International League and Venezuelan League.

Vanover was behind the plate when Marge Schott came on the field just prior to an April 1996 Astros–Reds doubleheader and apologized to Vanover for her Opening Day comments following the death of umpire John McSherry. The Opening Day game had been postponed after McSherry collapsed on the field; he died at a local hospital. After the game was postponed, Schott had said, "I feel cheated."

Vanover was one of 22 umpires who resigned during the 1999 Major League Umpires Association mass resignation. The negotiation strategy failed when baseball officials simply accepted the resignations and hired replacement umpires. After a protracted legal battle, Vanover and eight other umpires regained their major league jobs for the 2002 season.

MLB appointed Vanover to serve as crew chief for the 2014 Legend Series at Rod Carew Stadium in Panama City, Panama, on March 15–16. Vanover spent the 2014 season as an interim crew chief while regular crew chief Tim McClelland was on the disabled list. In September 2014, Vanover was the home plate umpire for Derek Jeter's final game. Vanover was officially promoted to permanent crew chief upon McClelland's retirement prior to the 2015 season. On May 24, 2019, Vanover umpired his 3,000th MLB game.

See also

 List of Major League Baseball umpires

References

External links
 Retrosheet

1955 births
Living people
Major League Baseball umpires
Sportspeople from Owensboro, Kentucky